Elophila orientalis is a moth in the family Crambidae. It was described by Ivan Nikolayevich Filipjev in 1933. It is found in China, Japan (Hokkaido, Honshu) and the Russian Far East (Ussuri).

The length of the forewings is 7.7-8.5 mm for males and 7.9-10.8 mm for females. The forewings are pale orange.

The larvae probably feed on Phragmites species.  They create a portable case of leaf fragments. Full-grown larvae reach a length of 15–18 mm.

References

Acentropinae
Moths described in 1933
Moths of Asia
Aquatic insects